Nancy Jane Miller Livingston Stratford (born June 12, 1919) is an American aviator. She flew warplanes in the civilian Air Transport Auxiliary in Great Britain during World War II and was later a pioneering helicopter pilot in Alaska.

Early life

She was born Nancy Jane Miller in Los Angeles on 12 June 1919.  She flew for the first time at sixteen when her brother took her on a sightseeing flight over Los Angeles. She was enchanted with flying and began studying aviation at Oakland Airport in 1939.

Career

In 1942 she joined the civilian Air Transport Auxiliary (ATA), ferrying warplanes around Great Britain to supply the Royal Air Force. She logged around 900 hours of flying and gained experience on about 50 different types of aircraft, claiming that her favorite was the Supermarine Spitfire.

Returning from the war, she had trouble finding employment in the traditionally male-dominated field. In 1947 she found work with a commercial service in Oregon where she flew, taught, and did bookkeeping. The same year she earned seaplane and helicopter certifications, becoming only the fourth woman in the world licensed to fly helicopters.

In 1960 she became the first woman helicopter operator in Alaska when she and her husband, Arlo Livingston, founded Livingston Copters near Juneau. Among her passengers was mountaineer Edmund Hillary, whom she flew to Alaska's Mendenhall Glacier in 1963. The business still operates, as NorthStar Helicopters.

In 1970 she was forced to give up her pilot's license due to deafness.

Later life

In 1978, she and her husband sold their helicopter business and moved to Washington.

After Arlo Livingston died in 1986, Stratford reconnected with a man to whom she'd been engaged during the war, Milton Stratford. The two married in 1992 and moved to San Diego. Milton died in 2008.

In 2013, encouraged by her niece Peg Miller, she published a memoir titled Contact! Britain!: A Woman Ferry Pilot's Story During WWII in England.

Upon the death of Jaye Edwards in August 2022, Stratford became the last surviving Attagirl, as the women pilots of the ATA were known.

Honors

In 2008 she was presented with an Air Transport Auxiliary Veterans Badge by British prime minister Gordon Brown.

In 2015 she was recognized as an Alaskan Aviation Legend by the Alaska Air Carriers Association.

References

Further reading

1919 births
Living people
American World War II pilots
American women in World War II
Air Transport Auxiliary pilots
Helicopter pilots
Aviators from California
American women aviators
20th-century American memoirists
American women memoirists
American centenarians
Women centenarians